Barry Allen Sadler (November 1, 1940 – November 5, 1989) was an American soldier, singer/songwriter, and author. Sadler served as a Green Beret medic, achieving the rank of Staff Sergeant. He served in the Vietnam War from late December 1964 to late May 1965. Most of his work has a military theme, and he is best known for his patriotic "Ballad of the Green Berets," a #1 hit in 1966. He died at age 49 after being shot in the head in Guatemala City.

Early life
Sadler was born in Carlsbad, New Mexico, the second son of John Sadler and Bebe Littlefield of Phoenix, Arizona. According to Sadler's autobiography, I'm A Lucky One, his father developed a successful plumbing and electrical business in Carlsbad and owned several farms in the area. He describes his mother as managing restaurants and bars, and at times, games in casinos.

The family relocated often. His parents divorced when Sadler was five, and his father died not long after at age 36 from a rare form of nervous system cancer. His mother moved her family around as she worked at temporary jobs in Arizona, California, Colorado, New Mexico, and Texas.

Career

Enlistment
Sadler dropped out of high school in the tenth grade in Leadville, Colorado. In 1958, at 17, he enlisted in the U.S. Air Force. He finished his General Educational Development certificate while in the Air Force. He trained as a radar technician in 1958 and was stationed in Japan. After his discharge in 1961, Sadler enlisted in the U.S. Army, and volunteered for Airborne and Special Forces, opting to be a medic.

Wounded in action
When he completed Airborne training, he underwent the lengthy training as a combat medic at Fort Sam Houston, Texas, Fort Jackson, South Carolina, and Fort Bragg, North Carolina. In May 1965, while he was on a combat patrol southeast of Pleiku in the Central Highlands, he was severely wounded in the knee by a feces-covered punji stick. Sadler dressed the wound with a cotton swab and an adhesive bandage, then completed the patrol; however, he subsequently developed a serious infection in his leg, and was evacuated to Clark Air Base Hospital in The Philippines. Doctors were forced to surgically enlarge the wound to drain it and to administer large doses of penicillin. Sadler returned to Fort Bragg where he made a complete recovery.

The Ballad of the Green Berets

Sadler recorded his famous song, "The Ballad of the Green Berets", a patriotic tune about the Special Forces, in December 1965. The writer Robin Moore, author of the novel The Green Berets, which became a 1968 movie, The Green Berets, featuring John Wayne, helped Sadler with lyrics and with getting a recording contract with RCA Victor Records. "The Ballad of the Green Berets" arranged as a choral version by Ken Darby was the title song of the movie. Moore also wrote an introduction to Sadler's autobiography, I'm A Lucky One, which he dictated to Tom Mahoney and was published by Macmillan Company in 1967. "The Ballad of the Green Berets" was released by RCA Victor Records in January 1966, and became a fast-selling single, holding No. 1 on the Billboard Hot 100 chart for five consecutive weeks from March 5 to April 2, 1966. The record sold more than nine million copies. The song was a great success in many U.S. cities; it scored five weeks at No. 1 on the weekly Good Guys music survey at WMCA, the top popular music radio station in New York during 1966. He sang it for his television début on January 30 on The Ed Sullivan Show. Sadler had recorded an album of similarly themed songs which he titled Ballads of the Green Berets. It sold a million copies during the first five weeks of its release. Sadler had a minor success, the similarly patriotic-themed "The 'A' Team", later the same year when that single scored #28.

Awards and decorations
According to the ribbons and badges worn by Sadler in a televised performance of "The Ballad of the Green Berets," he received the following awards for his military service: Purple Heart Medal, Army Good Conduct Medal, Armed Forces Expeditionary Medal, Air Force Longevity Service Award, Combat Infantryman Badge, Parachutist Badge, and the South Vietnamese Parachutist Badge.

The ribbons shown in Sadler's television performance mentioned above did not represent all of Sadler's awards. Sadler was also entitled to the National Defense Service Medal and the Vietnam Campaign Medal. He had the option of replacing the Armed Forces Expeditionary Medal with the Vietnam Service Medal. He is also seen in photographs in uniform wearing an Air Force Good Conduct Medal ribbon from his pre-Army service in the USAF.

Later years

Literary works
Sadler was unable to score anything close to a major success with his other songs, though "The A-Team" was a Top 30 Billboard chart single during 1966. He was honorably discharged from the Army in May 1967, and moved with his family to Tucson, Arizona. After minor acting parts in four episodes of two TV western series, Death Valley Days and The High Chaparral, and in the 1968 caper film Dayton's Devils starring Rory Calhoun, he moved to Nashville and began writing pulp fiction novels. His popular Casca series is about the title character, Casca Rufio Longinius (a combination of Longinus and the Wandering Jew), supposedly the Roman soldier who thrust his lance into Christ's side during the crucifixion. Casca is cursed to remain a soldier until the Second Coming. The novels feature Casca's life from biblical times to the 20th century. Sadler wrote the first twenty-two books. After his death, the series was continued with books by other authors.

List of works in the Casca novel series

Death of Lee Emerson Bellamy
On December 1, 1978, at about 11 p.m., Sadler killed a country music songwriter named Lee Emerson Bellamy with one gunshot to the head. The shooting was the culmination of a month-long dispute the men had concerning Darlene Sharpe, who was Bellamy's former girlfriend, and Sadler's lover at the time. Bellamy made many harassing telephone calls to Sadler and Sharpe, had one violent confrontation in a Nashville bar's parking lot, and threatened both their lives.

On the night in question, Bellamy made several harassing telephone calls, including one to the Natchez Trace Restaurant where Sadler and Sharpe were having dinner and drinks with two friends. That resulted in Sadler asking a bartender to telephone the police, who never responded. Bellamy later went to Sharpe's apartment complex and knocked on the door. Sadler exited through a side door. On seeing Sadler, Bellamy fled to his van. It was at that time, Sadler testified, that he saw a flash of metal. Believing it to be a gun, he fired one shot. The bullet struck Bellamy right between the eyes, and he died several hours later in a Nashville hospital. It turned out that Bellamy was unarmed. According to court records, Sadler had then placed a handgun in Bellamy's van, presumably to strengthen his claim of self-defense. After a plea bargain, on June 1, 1979, Sadler was convicted of voluntary manslaughter for the death of Bellamy, and sentenced to from 4 to 5 years in prison. His legal team worked to lower the sentence, which a judge reduced to just 30 days in the county workhouse. He served 28 days. Sadler was sued for wrongful death by Bellamy's stepson, and was ordered to pay compensation of about $10,000.

Death
Sadler moved to Guatemala City in 1984. He continued to write and publish his Casca books and produced a never-released self-defense video. On September 7, 1988, he was shot in the head while sitting in a cab in Guatemala City. His manager believed it to be a robbery. Sadler was flown to the United States by friends in a private jet.

He underwent surgery at the Nashville Veterans Administration (VA) Hospital, and remained in a coma for about six weeks. After emerging from the coma, Sadler was a quadriplegic and had suffered significant brain damage. He was finally released in January 1989, but his family reported him missing. A dispute over who would be his legal guardian erupted between his wife and mother and resulted in a judge mandating a psychiatric evaluation. A few days later, he was found, in time to be present at a competency hearing.

After being moved to the Cleveland VA Hospital for specialized treatment, he was removed from the hospital by two former Green Berets and his mother, Blanche Sadler. After a contentious court battle waged by his wife and children, a court in Tennessee ruled that Sadler be put under the care of an independent guardian. He was moved to the VA Hospital in Murfreesboro, Tennessee, in February 1989, but he never recovered from his injury. He died there of cardiac arrest on November 5, 1989, four days after his 49th birthday. Barry Sadler was survived by his wife, Lavona, a daughter, Brooke, and two sons, Thor and Baron. His son, Thor, served in the United States Army as a Military Intelligence Officer.

Awards and decorations
SSG Sadler's awards include:

Discography

Albums

Singles

References

External links

Ballad of the Green Beret: The Life and Wars of Staff Sergeant Barry Sadler(Stackpole Books, 2017)
Official Casca website

Barry Sadler, 49, Balladeer, Dies

1940 births
1989 deaths
20th-century American novelists
Deaths by firearm in Tennessee
American historical novelists
American male singer-songwriters
American male novelists
United States Army personnel of the Vietnam War
American singer-songwriters
RCA Victor artists
Burials in Tennessee
American shooting survivors
Members of the United States Army Special Forces
American murder victims
People from Carlsbad, New Mexico
Military personnel from New Mexico
Singers from New Mexico
Writers from New Mexico
United States Army soldiers
United States Air Force airmen
20th-century American singers
20th-century American male singers
20th-century American male writers